Brian Fatari (born 20 December 1999) is an Indonesian professional footballer who plays as a centre-back or defensive midfielder for Liga 1 club Dewa United.

Club career

Persipura Jayapura
He was signed for Persipura Jayapura to play in Liga 1 in the 2020 season. Brian Fatari made his first-team debut on 28 August 2021 as a substitute in a match against Persita Tangerang at the Pakansari Stadium, Cibinong.

Dewa United
Brian Fatari was signed for Dewa United to play in Liga 1 in the 2022–23 season. Brian made his debut on 14 January 2023 in a match against Persis Solo at the Indomilk Arena, Tangerang.

Career statistics

Club

Notes

References

External links
 Brian Fatari at Soccerway
 Brian Fatari at Liga Indonesia

1999 births
Living people
Indonesian footballers
Persipura Jayapura players
Liga 1 (Indonesia) players
People from Manado
Sportspeople from North Sulawesi
Association football defenders